Joseph Dixon may refer to:

Joseph Dixon (inventor) (1799–1869), American inventor, entrepreneur; founder of what became the Dixon Ticonderoga Company
Joseph Dixon (bishop) (1806–1866), Irish Roman Catholic Archbishop of Armagh
Joseph Dixon (North Carolina politician) (1828–1883), U.S. Representative from North Carolina
Joseph Dixon (Australian cricketer) (1836–1882), Australian cricketer
Joseph Dixon (English cricketer) (1895–1954), English cricketer
Joseph Dixon (soil scientist) (1906–1966), New Zealand soil chemist and scientific administrator
Joseph Dixon (Australian politician) (1911–2002), Tasmanian state politician
Joseph A. Dixon (1879–1942), U.S. Representative from Ohio
Joseph M. Dixon (1867–1934), American politician from Montana
Joseph K. Dixon, led the Wanamaker expeditions
Joe Dixon (musician) (1917–1998), American jazz reed musician
Joe Dixon (footballer, born 1916) (1916–2001), English footballer
Joe Dixon (Australian footballer) (born 1940), Australian rules footballer
Joe Dixon (actor) (born 1965), British television and film actor

See also
Joseph Dickson (disambiguation)